Descendents (also Solos in Chile) is a 2008 Chilean experimental horror film directed by Jorge Olguín, written by Carolina García and Olguín, and starring Camille Lynch.  Lynch plays a young child who attempts to cross a land divided by brutal fights between the military and roving zombies.

Plot 
After a virus causes a zombie apocalypse, the military engages in brutal warfare against the roving zombies.  Young mutants, who are immune to both the virus and the zombies, band together and attempt to escape the violence.  Camille, the oldest child, expects to find a safe haven by the coast, and she leads several younger children through the land, where they must avoid bloodthirsty soldiers who mistake them for zombies.  During the journey, flashbacks reveal background information about Camille and her mother.

Cast 
 Camille Lynch as Camille
 Karina Pizarro as Camille's mother
 Christobal Barra as boy
 Carolina Andrade as girl

Production 
Director Jorge Olguín shot Descendents while he was waiting for his next project, Caleuche: The Call of the Sea.  His first English-language film, Olguín cast the film after looking for English-speaking actors for Caleuche.  It was shot in seven days.  Descendents is billed as the first Chilean zombie film.

Release 
Descendents premiered at the Brussels International Fantastic Film Festival on April 7, 2008.  It received a theatrical release in Chile on October 16, 2008.  Lionsgate Films released it on DVD in the United States on May 15, 2012.

Reception 
William Harrison of DVD Talk rated it 1/5 stars and wrote, "Repetitive, confusing and boring, Descendents is a waste of time."  Gordon Sullivan of DVD Verdict called it "an impressive zombie flick" whose execution does not live up to its ambition or vision.  Devon Ashby of CraveOnline rated it 2/10 stars and wrote, "Descendents awkwardly unconventional execution and overreliance on child performers gives it an unfinished, diffuse quality that tragically disappoints rather than inspiring."  Marc Patterson of Brutal As Hell called it "smartly made and quite stunning to watch" but said that it eventually becomes boring, unsubtle, and superficial.  Peter Dendle wrote, "Despite its limitations, the movie uniquely situates the infected against an unforgettable, anemic world, one saturated throughout with sickness and veiled in pale ochre."

See also 
 List of killer octopus films

References

External links 
 

2008 films
2008 independent films
2000s science fiction horror films
Chilean independent films
Films shot in Chile
Post-apocalyptic films
2000s monster movies
Chilean zombie films
Films about cephalopods
2000s English-language films
English-language Chilean films